Surry County Courthouse is a historic courthouse building located at Dobson, Surry County, North Carolina. It was designed by architect Harry Barton and built in 1916.  It is a three-story, rectangular Classical Revival style tan brick building. The five bay front and rear elevations feature a central entrance flanked by pairs of Ionic order pilasters.  Two-story wings were added to the main block in 1971.

It was listed on the National Register of Historic Places in 1979.

References

County courthouses in North Carolina
Courthouses on the National Register of Historic Places in North Carolina
Neoclassical architecture in North Carolina
Government buildings completed in 1916
Buildings and structures in Surry County, North Carolina
National Register of Historic Places in Surry County, North Carolina